This is a list of events in Scottish television from 1987.

Events

January
No events.

February
No events.

March
3 March – Debut of the BBC Scotland drama Tutti Frutti.

April
No events.

May
No events.

June
11 – 12 June – Coverage of the results of the 1987 general election is broadcast both on BBC1 and ITV.
 29 June – Schools programmes are broadcast on ITV for the last time.

July
No events.

August
31 August – The 30th anniversary of Scottish Television.

September
7 September – ITV launches a full morning programme schedule, with advertising, for the first time. The new service includes regular five-minute national and Scottish news bulletins.
14 September – After 30 years on ITV, ITV Schools moves to Channel 4. Opt outs of the network schools schedule continue, thereby allowing programmes relevant to schools in Scotland to continue to be broadcast. To date, this is the only time that Scotland has opted out of the Channel 4 schedule.

October to December
No events.

Debuts

BBC
3 March – Tutti Frutti (1987)

Television series
Scotsport (1957–2008)
Reporting Scotland (1968–1983; 1984–present)
Top Club (1971–1998)
Scotland Today (1972–2009)
Sportscene (1975–present)
The Beechgrove Garden (1978–present)
Grampian Today (1980–2009)
Take the High Road (1980–2003)
Taggart (1983–2010)
James the Cat (1984–1992)
Crossfire on Grampian (1984–2004)
City Lights (1984–1991)
The Campbells (1986–1990)
Naked Video (1986–1991)

Ending this year
7 April – Tutti Frutti (1987)

Births
8 August – Katie Leung, actress

Deaths
4 February – Fyfe Robertson, 84, television journalist
6 June – Fulton Mackay, actor (Porridge'')
Unknown – Finlay J. MacDonald, 61, radio and television presenter

See also
1987 in Scotland

References

 
Television in Scotland by year
1980s in Scottish television